The 2022 Loudoun United FC season was Loudoun United FC's fourth season of existence, their fourth in the second-division of American soccer, and their fourth in the USL Championship. 

The 2022 marked an improvement in United's overall record, winning twice as many matches as last season. Despite this, the club still finished with a losing record, and failed to qualify for the playoffs for their fourth consecutive season. Notable offseason pickups included Tyler Freeman, who lead Loudoun in goals during the season. Other major pickups included Rio Hope-Gund, Carson Vom Steeg, and Skage Simonsen. During the season, several players on Loudoun were promoted to the first team including Kristian Fletcher, Sami Guediri, and Jackson Hopkins.

Background 

The 2021 season was Loudoun United's third season of existence. The club played in the second tier of American soccer, the USL Championship. There, the club finished with the worst record in USL Championship, with 4–3–25, scoring 31 goals and allowing 78, by far the worst goal differential in the league. Midfielder Ted Ku-DiPietro lead the team with seven goals during the course of the season, and also lead the team with three assists during the 2021 campaign. Jovanny Bolívar finished with six goals during the season, while Samson Sergi finished with three goals. Jermaine Fordah finished the season with two clean sheets.

The club failed to qualify for the 2021 USL Championship Playoffs.

Transfers

Transfers in

Transfers out

Loans in

Loans out

Roster

Team management

Roster

On loan

Non-competitive

Preseason exhibitions

Midseason exhibitions 
To be announced

Competitive

USL Championship

Standings

Results summary

Results by matchday

Match results

Statistics

Appearances and goals 
Numbers after plus-sign(+) denote appearances as a substitute.

|-

|-
! colspan=10 style=background:#dcdcdc; text-align:center| Players transferred out during the season 
|-

|-
!colspan="4"|Total
!27!!30!!27!!30!!0!!0

Top scorers 
{| class="wikitable" style="font-size: 100%; text-align: center;"
|-
! style="background:#FFFFFF; color:#FF0000; border:2px solid #FF0000; width:35px;" scope="col"|Rank
! style="background:#FFFFFF; color:#FF0000; border:2px solid #FF0000; width:35px;" scope="col"|Position
! style="background:#FFFFFF; color:#FF0000; border:2px solid #FF0000; width:35px;" scope="col"|No.
! style="background:#FFFFFF; color:#FF0000; border:2px solid #FF0000; width:160px;" scope="col"|Name
! style="background:#FFFFFF; color:#FF0000; border:2px solid #FF0000; width:75px;" scope="col"|
! style="background:#FFFFFF; color:#FF0000; border:2px solid #FF0000; width:75px;" scope="col"|
! style="background:#FFFFFF; color:#FF0000; border:2px solid #FF0000; width:75px;" scope="col"|Total
|-
| 1 || FW || 11 ||align="left"|  Tyler Freeman || 6 || 0 || 6
|-
|rowspan="2"| 2 || FW || 35 ||align="left"|  Abdellatif Aboukoura || 4 || 0 || 4
|-
| FW || 45 ||align="left"|  Kristian Fletcher || 4 || 0 || 4
|-
|rowspan="4"| 4 || DF || 3 ||align="left"|  Jacob Greene || 2 || 0 || 2
|-
| MF || 7 ||align="left"|  Abdoul Zanne || 2 || 0 || 2
|-
| MF || 8 ||align="left"|  Skage Simonsen || 2 || 0 || 2
|-
| DF || 21 ||align="left"|  Sami Guediri || 2 || 0 || 2
|-
|rowspan="7"| 8 || DF || 5 ||align="left"|  Grant Lillard || 1 || 0 || 1
|-
| FW || 9 ||align="left"|  Jonathan Benteke || 1 || 0 || 1
|-
| MF || 14 ||align="left"|  Jeremy Garay || 1 || 0 || 1
|-
| FW || 17 ||align="left"|  Kimarni Smith || 1 || 0 || 1
|-
| MF || 24 ||align="left"|  Jalen Robinson || 1 || 0 || 1
|-
| FW || 46 ||align="left"|  Alexander Dexter || 1 || 0 || 1
|-
| MF || 27 ||align="left"|  Moses Nyeman || 1 || 0 || 1
|-
!colspan="4"|Total
!29!!0!!29

Top assists 
{| class="wikitable" style="font-size: 100%; text-align: center;"
|-
! style="background:#FFFFFF; color:#FF0000; border:2px solid #FF0000; width:35px;" scope="col"|Rank
! style="background:#FFFFFF; color:#FF0000; border:2px solid #FF0000; width:35px;" scope="col"|Position
! style="background:#FFFFFF; color:#FF0000; border:2px solid #FF0000; width:35px;" scope="col"|No.
! style="background:#FFFFFF; color:#FF0000; border:2px solid #FF0000; width:160px;" scope="col"|Name
! style="background:#FFFFFF; color:#FF0000; border:2px solid #FF0000; width:75px;" scope="col"|
! style="background:#FFFFFF; color:#FF0000; border:2px solid #FF0000; width:75px;" scope="col"|
! style="background:#FFFFFF; color:#FF0000; border:2px solid #FF0000; width:75px;" scope="col"|Total
|-
| 1 || MF || 8 ||align="left"|  Skage Simonsen || 4 || 0 || 4
|-
| 2 || MF || 10 ||align="left"|  Mike Gamble || 3 || 0 || 3 
|-
|rowspan="4"| 3 || MF || 7 ||align="left"|  Abdoul Zanne || 2 || 0 || 2 
|-
| MF || 12 ||align="left"|  Zoumana Diarra || 2 || 0 || 2 
|-
| MF || 15 ||align="left"|  Nicky Downs || 2 || 0 || 2 
|-
| MF || 20 ||align="left"|  Ted Ku-DiPietro || 2 || 0 || 2 
|-
|rowspan="6"| 6 || DF || 3 ||align="left"|  Jacob Greene || 1 || 0 || 1
|-
| DF || 5 ||align="left"|  Grant Lillard || 1 || 0 || 1
|-
| FW || 11 ||align="left"|  Tyler Freeman || 1 || 0 || 1
|-
| MF || 14 ||align="left"|  Jeremy Garay || 1 || 0 || 1
|-
| MF || 19 ||align="left"|  Nanan Houssou || 1 || 0 || 1
|-
| FW || 35 ||align="left"|  Abdellatif Aboukoura || 1 || 0 || 1
|-
!colspan="4"|Total
!21!!0!!21

Disciplinary record 
{| class="wikitable" style="font-size: 100%; text-align:center;"
|-
| rowspan="2" !width=15|
| rowspan="2" !width=15|
| rowspan="2" !width=120|Player
| colspan="3"|USLC
| colspan="3"|USL Cup
| colspan="3"|Total
|-
!width=34; background:#fe9;|
!width=34; background:#fe9;|
!width=34; background:#ff8888;|
!width=34; background:#fe9;|
!width=34; background:#fe9;|
!width=34; background:#ff8888;|
!width=34; background:#fe9;|
!width=34; background:#fe9;|
!width=34; background:#ff8888;|
|-
| 2 || DF ||align="left"| Rio Hope-Gund || 4 || 0 || 1 || 0 || 0 || 0 || 4 || 0 || 1
|-
| 3 || DF ||align="left"| Jacob Greene || 7 || 0 || 0 || 0 || 0 || 0 || 7 || 0 || 0
|-
| 4 || MF ||align="left"| Carson Vom Steeg || 1 || 0 || 0 || 0 || 0 || 0 || 1 || 0 || 0
|-
| 5 || DF ||align="left"| Grant Lillard || 4 || 0 || 0 || 0 || 0 || 0 || 4 || 0 || 0
|-
| 7 || MF ||align="left"| Abdoul Zanne || 5 || 0 || 0 || 0 || 0 || 0 || 5 || 0 || 0
|-
| 10 || MF ||align="left"| Mike Gamble || 1 || 0 || 0 || 0 || 0 || 0 || 1 || 0 || 0
|-
| 11 || FW ||align="left"| Tyler Freeman || 2 || 0 || 0 || 0 || 0 || 0 || 2 || 0 || 0
|-
| 12 || MF ||align="left"| Zoumana Diarra || 4 || 0 || 0 || 0 || 0 || 0 || 4 || 0 || 0
|-
| 12 || GK ||align="left"| Joe Rice || 1 || 0 || 0 || 0 || 0 || 0 || 1 || 0 || 0
|-
| 15 || MF ||align="left"| Nicky Downs || 5 || 0 || 0 || 0 || 0 || 0 || 5 || 0 || 0
|-
| 17 || FW ||align="left"| Kimarni Smith || 2 || 0 || 0 || 0 || 0 || 0 || 2 || 0 || 0
|-
| 18 || FW ||align="left"| Azaad Liadi || 2 || 0 || 1 || 0 || 0 || 0 || 2 || 0 || 1
|-
| 19 || DF ||align="left"| Nanan Houssou || 3 || 0 || 1 || 0 || 0 || 0 || 3 || 0 || 1
|-
| 20 || DF ||align="left"| Hayden Sargis || 2 || 0 || 1 || 0 || 0 || 0 || 2 || 0 || 1
|-
| 21 || DF ||align="left"| Sami Guediri || 1 || 1 || 0 || 0 || 0 || 0 || 1 || 1 || 0
|-
| 22 || MF ||align="left"| Ted Ku-DiPietro || 2 || 0 || 0 || 0 || 0 || 0 || 2 || 0 || 0
|-
| 32 || DF ||align="left"| Jace Clark || 2 || 0 || 0 || 0 || 0 || 0 || 2 || 0 || 0
|-
| 33 || MF ||align="left"| Jacob Greene || 1 || 0 || 0 || 0 || 0 || 0 || 1 || 0 || 0
|-
| 37 || MF ||align="left"| Ignacio Alem || 1 || 0 || 0 || 0 || 0 || 0 || 1 || 0 || 0
|-
| 50 || GK ||align="left"| Luis Zamudio || 5 || 0 || 0 || 0 || 0 || 0 || 5 || 0 || 0
|-
!colspan=3|Total !!55!!1!!4!!0!!0!!0!!55!!1!!4

Clean sheets
{| class="wikitable" style="text-align: center;"
|-
! style="background:#FFFFFF; color:#FF0000; border:2px solid #FF0000; width:35px;" scope="col"|No.
! style="background:#FFFFFF; color:#FF0000; border:2px solid #FF0000; width:160px;" scope="col"|Name
! style="background:#FFFFFF; color:#FF0000; border:2px solid #FF0000; width:50px;" scope="col"|
! style="background:#FFFFFF; color:#FF0000; border:2px solid #FF0000; width:50px;" scope="col"|
! style="background:#FFFFFF; color:#FF0000; border:2px solid #FF0000; width:50px;" scope="col"|Total
! style="background:#FFFFFF; color:#FF0000; border:2px solid #FF0000; width:50px;" scope="col"|Games
|-
| 50 ||align="left"| Luis Zamudio || 6 || 0 || 6 || 21
|-
!colspan="2"|Total
!6!!0!!6!!21

See also 
 2022 D.C. United season

References

External links 
 Loudoun United FC

Loudoun United FC seasons
Loudoun United FC
Loudoun United FC
Loudoun United